NGC 75 is a lenticular galaxy estimated to be about 260 million light-years away in the constellation of Pisces. It was discovered by Lewis A. Swift from the USA in 1886 and its magnitude is 13.2.

References

External links
 

0075
001255
Pisces (constellation)
18861022
Lenticular galaxies